Ujung is a village in Bali in the Lesser Sunda Islands of Indonesia. It is located 1.8 miles outside Kuta on the south coast of the island .

Nearby towns and villages include Tuban (1.5 nm), Pesanggaran (1.1 nm), Serangan (1.6 nm), Jimbaran (2.5 nm) and Benoa (2.1 nm).

References

Populated places in Bali